was a town located in Shūchi District, Shizuoka Prefecture, Japan. Haruno was founded as a town on September 30, 1956.

As of June 1, 2005, the town had an estimated population of 5,953 and a density of 23.6 persons per km2. The total area was 252.17 km2. Mount Akiba was located within the town limits.

On July 1, 2005, Haruno, along with the cities of Tenryū and Hamakita, the towns of Hosoe, Inasa and Mikkabi (all from Inasa District), the towns of Misakubo and Sakuma, the village of Tatsuyama (all from Iwata District), and the towns of Maisaka and Yūtō (both from Hamana District), was merged into the expanded city of Hamamatsu, and is now part of Tenryū-ku, Hamamatsu.

External links
 Hamamatsu official website 

Dissolved municipalities of Shizuoka Prefecture
Hamamatsu